Tom or Thomas Chambers may refer to:

Government and politics
 Sir Thomas Chambers (colonial administrator) (died 1692), British administrator and factor of the British East India Company in Madras
 Sir Thomas Chambers (British politician) (1814–1891), English politician
 Thomas Jefferson Chambers (1840–1929), member of the Texas House of Representatives
 Tom Chambers (politician) (1928–2018), member of the Legislative Assembly of Alberta
 Tom Chambers (judge) (1943–2013), Associate Justice of the Washington State Supreme Court

Sports
 Thomas Chambers (fl. 1731), English cricketer, see List of English cricketers to 1771#1726 to 1750
 Thomas Chambers (footballer) (fl. 1892–1897), Scottish international footballer
 Tom Chambers (bowls) (fl. 1930), Canadian lawn bowls player
 Thomas Chambers (cricketer) (1931–2015), South African cricketer
 Tom Chambers (basketball) (born 1959), American basketball player

Others
 Thomas Chambers (painter) (1808–1869), English-born American maritime and landscape painter
 Tom Chambers (trade unionist) (1867–1926), British trade union leader
 Tom Chambers (actor) (born 1977), English actor
 Thomas Chambers (born 1990), Canadian actor, twin brother of Munro Chambers

See also
 Thomas Chalmers (1780–1847), Scottish minister
 Thomas Chambers Hine (1814–1899), English architect